The Drina is a river in Bosnia and Herzegovina and Serbia on the Balkan Peninsula, and should not be confused with a rivers in Albania, the Drin and the Drino.

Drina may also refer to:

 Drina Banovina, a province of the Kingdom of Yugoslavia 1929-1941
 Drina (Višegrad), a village in Bosnia and Herzegovina
 Drina (župa), a medieval country in the Drina valley
 Drina (butterfly), a genus of butterflies
 Drina donina or the brown yamfly
 Drina (cigarette), a Bosnian brand
 Drina niška (cigarette), a Serbian brand
 FK Drina HE Višegrad, a Bosnian football club
 FK Drina Zvornik, a Bosnian football club
 Drina series, a series of children's novels by Mabel Esther Allan writing as Jean Estoril
 A brand name of co-cyprindiol (cyproterone acetate/ethinylestradiol), an oral contraceptive